Rosales is one of the 67 municipalities of Chihuahua, in northern Mexico. The municipal seat lies at Santa Cruz de Rosales. The municipality covers an area of 1716.6 km².

As of 2010, the municipality had a total population of 16,785, up from 15,935 as of 2005. 

The municipality had 572 localities, the largest of which (with 2010 populations in parentheses) were: Santa Cruz de Rosales (5,570), Congregación Ortíz (2,620), classified as urban, and El Molino (2,191) and Kilómetro Noventa y Nueve (1,092), classified as rural.

Geography

Towns and villages
The municipality has 71 localities. The largest are:

References

Municipalities of Chihuahua (state)